The Ohio League was an informal and loose association of American football clubs active between 1902 and 1919 that competed for the Ohio Independent Championship (OIC). As the name implied, its teams were mostly based in Ohio. It is the direct predecessor to the modern National Football League (NFL).

A proposal to add teams from outside Ohio, such as the Latrobe Athletic Association, to form a formal league known as the "Football Association" fell through prior to the 1904 season.

Though a champion was declared by the group throughout its existence, a formal league was not founded until 1920, when several Ohio League teams added clubs from other states to form the American Professional Football Association. In 1922, the APFA became the National Football League.

All but one of the remaining Ohio League teams left the NFL after the 1926 season, with the sole remaining team, the Dayton Triangles, surviving until 1929, before moving several times and eventually ending up in Dallas, after which they were officially canceled by the NFL, who sold the players and assets to Carroll Rosenbloom in Baltimore, where they were re-named the Colts. The team moved again in 1984 and the descendant of the Triangles franchise is ostensibly now in Indianapolis, just 117 miles to the west of their origin.

Championships

Other teams

Akron Pros
Cincinnati Celts
Cleveland Panthers (debuted 1919, mainly played non-Ohio teams)
Cleveland Tigers
Coleman Athletic Club
Columbus Panhandles
Franklin Athletic Club of Cleveland
Ironton Tanks (merger of Irish Town Rags and the Lombards)
Lancaster Anchors
Portsmouth Spartans (moved to Detroit in 1933, now known as the Detroit Lions) 
Shelby Tigers (merged with Shelby Blues in 1911)
Toledo Maroons
Youngstown Patricians
Zanesville Mark Greys

Further, the Detroit Heralds, though based in Michigan, played many of its games against Ohio teams.

Successor leagues

Ohio Valley League (1925-1929)
Some of the better teams of the 1920s, who did not join the NFL existed in the Ohio Valley, and would form an unofficial but recognized circuit - The Ohio Valley League - which resembled the old Ohio League. The "league" collapsed at the beginning of the Great Depression.

The two stronger teams in the league were the Portsmouth Spartans and the Ironton Tanks, that in the year after the circuit died (1930) beat the New York Giants and Chicago Bears, while the Spartans would join the NFL and would later become the Detroit Lions. Two other noteworthy teams were the Armco Corporation employees teams - Ashland Armco Yellowjackets (Kentucky) and Middletown Armco Blues (Ohio), who featured many former college All-Americans, including Red Roberts.

Champions
1925 Ironton Tanks (9-1-2)
1926 Ironton Tanks (11-1-1)
1927 Ashland Armco Yellowjackets (7-1-3)
1928 Ironton Tanks (7-1-3)
1929 Portsmouth Spartans (12-2-1)

Ohio Professional Football League (1941)
In 1941, there was a resurgence in pro football in Ohio, as local teams tried to form a new professional league called The Ohio Professional Football League (also known as Ohio Valley League). Six teams came together in an attempt to restore the region's former old glory: The Dayton Dakotas, Dayton Merchants, Cincinnati Pepsi-Colas, Columbus Avondales, Middletown Merchants, and another Canadian team the Thomas Athletic Club from Windsor, Ontario, but they withdrew from the league before the season started.
 
The circuit operated on a much smaller scale from previous leagues, and did not return for a second season.

See also
Canton Bulldogs-Massillon Tigers Betting Scandal
History of the National Football League
New York Pro Football League, another NFL predecessor
Western Pennsylvania Professional Football Circuit, another early pro football circuit that competed at times with various Ohio League teams.

Notes 
 
 NFL.com history pages: 1869-1910 and 1911-1920
 Sye, Roy. Independent Football History (Sye is Vice-President of the Professional Football Researchers Association committee in charge of researching professional football prior to 1920.)

References 

 
American football in Ohio
Sports organizations established in 1902
1902 establishments in Ohio
1919 disestablishments in Ohio
Defunct professional sports leagues in the United States